Paul Cadieux is a Canadian film and television producer. He won the Genie Award for Best Motion Picture for The Triplets of Belleville (Les Triplettes de Belleville).

Filmography 

 Anatane: Saving the Children of Okura (2018) (executive producer)
 An Eye for an Eye (2016) (producer)
 Zixx Level One (2004) (executive producer)
 Les Triplettes de Belleville (2003) (co-producer)
 Beluga Speaking Across Time (2002) (executive producer)
 Mission banquise: le voyage immobile (2002) (co-producer)
 Rotten Ralph (1999) (executive producer)
 In Dreams: The Roy Orbison Story (1999) 
 The Basque Whalers of Labrador (1985)

External links 
 

Film producers from Quebec
Canadian television producers
Living people
Year of birth missing (living people)
Canadian Screen Award winners